Wari Willka, also Wariwillka (hispanicized spellings Huarihuilca, Huariwilka, Huarivilca, Huarivillca, Huariwillka, Warivilca, Wariwillca, Wariwilka, Wari Willca), is an archaeological site in Peru. It is located in the Junín Region, Huancayo Province, Huancan District.

Gallery

References

External links

Archaeological sites in Peru
Archaeological sites in Junín Region